The 2018 Xerox Super Cup was held on 10 February 2018 between the 2017 J1 League champions Kawasaki Frontale and the 2017 Emperor's Cup winner Cerezo Osaka. Cerezo won the title after winning 3–2.

Match details

See also
2017 J1 League
2017 Emperor's Cup

References

Japanese Super Cup
Super
Kawasaki Frontale matches
Cerezo Osaka matches